Stefaniuk is a Polish surname. Notable people with the surname include:

 Franciszek Stefaniuk (born 1944), Polish politician
 Rob Stefaniuk (born 1971), Canadian comedian, actor, and writer
 Zenon Stefaniuk (1930–1985), Polish boxer

See also
 Stefanik

Polish-language surnames